Ofei is a surname. Notable people with the surname include:

Bernice Ofei, Ghanaian gospel artist
David Ofei (born 1989), Ghanaian footballer
Mohamed Ofei Sylla (born 1974), Guinean footballer

See also
Offei, another surname